Delivery unit may refer to:
 Hospital labor ward
 Prime Minister's Delivery Unit